La maldición de la blonda (English title:The curse of the lace) is a Mexican telenovela produced by Televisa and transmitted by Telesistema Mexicano.

Cast 
Gloria Marín as Doña Concepcion
Nadia Milton as  Manuela
Carlos Piñar
Dunia Saldívar
Rafael del Río
Socorro Avelar
Eric del Castillo
Fedora Capdevila as Juvencia
Malena Doria as Dolores
Edith González
Nina Green as Cora
Miguel Ángel Sanroman as Fabian

References 

Mexican horror fiction television series
Mexican telenovelas
1971 telenovelas
Televisa telenovelas
Spanish-language telenovelas
1971 Mexican television series debuts
1971 Mexican television series endings